Boko, or Boo, is a Mande language of Benin and Nigeria.

Names 
Boko language can be better known as Boko, but it is also known as Boo or with the Hausa name Busanci (also spelled Busanchi, Bussanci
Or Bussanchi).

One person or speaker is called a Bokoni and more persons/speakers are called Bokona and the language of the Bokona/Bussawa people is called Bokonya.

The Boko people are one of two subgroups of the Bissa people, the other being the Busa people, who speak the Busa language. They are not a clan but a subgroup. They are related to the Bariba people, who speak the Bariba language, which is a Gur language. The Bissa people proper speak the Bissa language, which is closely related to Boko.

Geographic distribution

Nigeria 
In Nigeria, Boko is spoken in Borgu LGA of Niger State, in Bagudo LGA of Kebbi State, and in Baruten LGA of Kwara state. A number of Boko have migrated to other parts of Nigeria, including Abuja. The Boko people are referred to as Bussawa in Hausa.

Benin 
In Benin, Boko is spoken in Alibori and Borgou departments (Segbana and Kalalé Comunes).

Classification 
Boko language is the most populous of the Mande languages of Benin. It is part of the Eastern Mande group, which also includes several other languages spoken across the Volta River and the Borgu Kingdom, including Busa, Bissa, Samo, and Bokobaru.

Boko speakers also speak Busa, Bariba, Dendi, Hausa, Yoruba, Fulfulde, French, and English.

Orthography 
Boko language has 25 letters (Aa, Bb, Dd, Ee, Ɛɛ, Ff, Gg, Gb gb, Ii, Kk, Kp kp, Ll, Mm, Nn, Oo, Ɔɔ, Pp, Rr, Ss, Tt, Uu, Vv, Ww, Yy, Zz).

Nasalised vowels are marked with a Tilde.

High tones are marked with an acute accent  and low tones are marked with a grave accent.

References

Mande languages
Languages of Benin
Languages of Nigeria